Victor Johnson was an Australian rules footballer from South Australia. He captained the 1928 Port Adelaide premiership. He also coached  South Adelaide to a premiership in 1935. As a journalist working for the Sunday Mail (Adelaide) he noted how speed was changing how the game was being played.

See also
 1927 Melbourne Carnival

Footnotes

Port Adelaide Football Club (SANFL) players
Port Adelaide Football Club players (all competitions)
South Adelaide Football Club coaches
Lefroy Football Club players
Australian rules footballers from South Australia
South Australian Football Hall of Fame inductees
Year of birth missing
Year of death missing